The ToyotaCare 250 is a NASCAR Xfinity Series race that takes place at Richmond Raceway in Richmond, Virginia. The race was first held during the inaugural season for the Xfinity Series in 1982 as a 150-lap event. The race was removed from the schedule after 1984. It returned to the series starting in 1990 as a 200 lap race. It was expanded to 250 lap distance in 1994. In 2016, as part of an overhauling of the Richmond spring race weekend, including the new Dash4Cash format, the total of 210-laps and had two 35-lap heat races and a 140-lap feature. In 2017, the heat races were discontinued (as a result of stage racing being implemented that year), and the race returned to its 250-lap distance with the new stage format: stages 1 and 2 were 75 laps long, and stage 3 made up the remaining 100 laps.

NASCAR removed the spring Richmond race in 2020 in favor of a race at Martinsville Speedway in October, though Richmond still maintained their other race on the Xfinity Series schedule in September, the Go Bowling 250. Even though Richmond lost one of their two Xfinity races, likely in exchange, NASCAR gave the track a Truck Series race to be run in April like the Xfinity Series. Despite the removal from the regular schedule, the race was briefly restored during the 2020 season as a replacement for the Michigan International Speedway event due to the COVID-19 pandemic, serving as the second round in a September doubleheader with the Go Bowling 250. Richmond downscaled to one race in 2021. In 2022, Richmond's one Xfinity Series race moved from September to April.

Past winners

1984: 150 lap distance race time and average speed record.
1993: 200 lap distance race time and average speed record.
2005, 2008, 2010–11, and 2016–17: Race extended due to a NASCAR overtime finish.
2006: Race was delayed because of rain and finished at midnight.
2011: 250 lap distance race time and average speed record even with overtime.
2016: The main event was reduced to 140 laps, while 70 other laps were divided into two heat races for the Xfinity Dash 4 Cash program. However, due to a NASCAR overtime from a late caution, the race ran 149 laps instead.  
2020: After initially being removed from the schedule, the race was added back as the second race of a September doubleheader due to COVID-19 (replacing the race at Michigan International Speedway).

Multiple winners (drivers)

Multiple winners (teams)

Manufacturer wins

Qualifying race winners

References

External links
 

1982 establishments in Virginia
NASCAR Xfinity Series races
 
Recurring sporting events established in 1982
Toyota
Annual sporting events in the United States